The 2021 Pennzoil 400 presented by Jiffy Lube was a NASCAR Cup Series race held on March 7, 2021 at Las Vegas Motor Speedway in Las Vegas. Contested over 267 laps on the  asphalt intermediate speedway, it was the fourth race of the 2021 NASCAR Cup Series season.

Report

Background

Las Vegas Motor Speedway, located in Clark County, Nevada outside the Las Vegas city limits and about 15 miles northeast of the Las Vegas Strip, is a  complex of multiple tracks for motorsports racing. The complex is owned by Speedway Motorsports, Inc., which is headquartered in Charlotte, North Carolina.

Entry list
 (R) denotes rookie driver.
 (i) denotes driver who are ineligible for series driver points.

Qualifying
Kevin Harvick was awarded the pole for the race as determined by competition-based formula.

Starting Lineup

Race
Kyle Larson won the race for Hendrick Motorsports, driving the #5 HendrickCars.com Chevrolet. It was his first win since he was sacked by Chip Ganassi Racing in 2020 after he said a racial slur. He also won stage two. Brad Keselowski finished second after winning stage one. Kyle Busch finished third after he passed Denny Hamlin, who was followed by Ryan Blaney.

Stage Results

Stage One
Laps: 80

Stage Two
Laps: 80

Final Stage Results

Stage Three
Laps: 107

Race statistics
 Lead changes: 27 among 12 different drivers
 Cautions/Laps: 6 for 30
 Red flags: 0
 Time of race: 2 hours, 52 minutes and 7 seconds
 Average speed:

Media

Television
Fox Sports covered their 21st race at the Las Vegas Motor Speedway. Mike Joy, 2001 race winner Jeff Gordon and Clint Bowyer called the race from the broadcast booth. Jamie Little and Regan Smith handled pit road for the television side. Larry McReynolds provided insight from the Fox Sports studio in Charlotte.

Radio
PRN covered the radio call for the race which was also simulcasted on Sirius XM NASCAR Radio. Doug Rice and Mark Garrow called the race in the booth where the field raced through the tri-oval. Rob Albright called the race from a billboard in turn 2 where the field raced through turns 1 and 2. Pat Patterson called the race from a billboard outside of turn 3 where the field raced through turns 3 and 4. Brad Gillie, Brett McMillan and Wendy Venturini worked pit road for the radio side.

Standings after the race

Drivers' Championship standings

Manufacturers' Championship standings

Note: Only the first 16 positions are included for the driver standings.

References

2021 in sports in Nevada
2021 NASCAR Cup Series
March 2021 sports events in the United States
NASCAR races at Las Vegas Motor Speedway